Igaliku is a settlement in the Kujalleq municipality in southern Greenland. The town was founded as Igaliko in 1783 by the trader and colonial administrator Anders Olsen and Greenlandic wife Tuperna. In 2020, Igaliku had 21 inhabitants. The nearby Norse ruins of Garðar and the farms surrounding the town were inscribed on the UNESCO World Heritage List in 2017 as part of the Kujataa Greenland: Norse and Inuit Farming at the Edge of the Ice Cap site.

Geography 
Igaliku is located southeast of Narsarsuaq, on a peninsula jutting off the mainland of Greenland near the eastern shore of upper Tunulliarfik Fjord. Access to Igaliku from Narsarsauq is cheaper and easier by landing at the small harbor of Itilleq and then crossing the isthmus 4 km (2.5 mi).

Landmarks and sights 
Igaliku is best known for the ruins of Garðar, once the religious heart of 12th-century Norse Greenland. The area was at the very heart of the Eastern Settlement and has been extensively archaeologically excavated since the 1830s. There are several historical graves in the area, although most have not presently been identified. The nearby area was documented by New York fine art photographer, Steve Giovinco, as part of a grant from the Scandinavian-American Foundation.

Infrastructure 
The settlement has a general store, a church including the congregation building, and a school, Atuarfik Igaliku (Greenlandic for "the school of Igaliku"). There is only one road into the village (called King's Road), which connects Igaliku to a small dock at the farming settlement, Itilleq.

Population 
The population of Igaliku has been stable in the last two decades.

Climate
Igaliku has a tundra climate (ET) with cool summers and cold winters.

References

Populated places in Greenland
Populated places established in 1783
Kujalleq